In 2011, the Bangladesh Bureau of Statistics, conducted a national census in Bangladesh, which provided a provisional estimate of the total population of the country as 142,319,000. The previous decennial census was the 2001 census. Data were recorded from all of the districts and upazilas and main cities in Bangladesh including statistical data on population size, households, sex and age distribution, marital status, economically active population, literacy and educational attainment, religion, number of children etc.  Bangladesh and India also conducted their first joint census of areas along their border in 2011. According to the census, Hindus constituted 8.5 per cent of the population as of 2011, down from 9.6 per cent in the 2001 census.

Bangladesh have a population of 144,043,697 as per 2011 census report. Majority of 130,201,097 reported that they were Muslims, 12,301,331 reported as Hindus, 864,262 as Buddhists, 532,961 as Christians and 201,661 as others.

See also 
 Demographics of Bangladesh
 1991 Census of Bangladesh
 2001 Census of Bangladesh
 2022 Census of Bangladesh

References

Censuses in Bangladesh
Census
Bangladesh